Will Smith (born 1968) is an American rapper, actor and film producer. 

Will Smith may also refer to:

 Will Smith (comedian) (born 1971), British comedian, actor and writer
 Will Smith (defensive end) (1981–2016), American football defensive end
 Will Smith (journalist), American tech journalist
 Will Smith (linebacker, born 1992), American football linebacker
 Will Smith (footballer, born 1998), English footballer for Harrogate Town
 Will Smith (pitcher) (born 1989), American pitcher in Major League Baseball
 Will Smith (catcher) (born 1995), American baseball catcher
 Will Smith (cricketer) (born 1982), English cricketer
 Will Smith (rugby league) (born 1992), Australian rugby league player

Fictional characters
 Will Smith (The Fresh Prince of Bel-Air), from American sitcom The Fresh Prince of Bel-Air, based on the real-life rapper
 Will Smith (Home and Away), from Australian soap opera Home and Away
 Will Smith, child character in Wee Sing The Best Christmas Ever!

See also
 Willard Smith (disambiguation)
 William Smith (disambiguation)
 Willi Smith (1948–1987), American fashion designer